María Luisa Ramos Urzagaste is Bolivia's Ambassador to Spain since 2016 and was Ambassador to Russia, presenting her credentials to Russian President Dmitry Medvedev on 12 October 2009.  She served in Russia until 2015.

References

Living people
Ambassadors of Bolivia to Russia
Bolivian women diplomats
21st-century diplomats
Year of birth missing (living people)
Ambassadors of Bolivia to Spain
Bolivian woman ambassadors